Tortrix sinapina, the Japanese oak leafroller, is a species of moth of the family Tortricidae. It is found in the Russian Far East (Ussuri), China (Zhejiang) and Japan (Honshu, Hokkaido).

The wingspan is 18–25 mm.

The larvae feed on Quercus mongolica, Quercus dentata, Lespedeza bicolor, Tilia japonica and Sorbus alnifolia. They roll the leaves of their host plant, creating a cigar-shaped shelter from which they feed. The larvae are green or whitish-green with a black head. The species overwinters as an egg.

References

Moths described in 1879
Tortricini
Moths of Asia
Moths of Japan
Taxa named by Arthur Gardiner Butler